Monza cretacea, the white-bodied grass skipper, is a butterfly in the family Hesperiidae. It is found in Guinea, Sierra Leone, Liberia, Ivory Coast, Ghana, Togo, Nigeria, Cameroon, the Republic of the Congo, Angola, the Democratic Republic of the Congo, Uganda, western Kenya and western Tanzania. The habitat consists of drier forests and secondary habitats and occasionally Guinea savanna.

Adults are attracted to flowers.

The larvae feed on Setaria megaphylla and Saccharum officinarum.

References

Butterflies described in 1872
Erionotini
Butterflies of Africa
Taxa named by Pieter Cornelius Tobias Snellen